Chen Huimin may refer to:
Chen Hui-min (born 1972), Taiwanese politician
Michael Chan (actor) (born 1946), or Chen Huimin, Hong Kong actor